The Inner Fort barangays may refer to one of the two barangays.

Post Proper Northside, Makati
Post Proper Southside, Makati